Aurelianus is a genus of seed bugs in the tribe Mictini, erected by William Lucas Distant in 1902.

References

External links
 

Coreidae genera
Coreinae